The Simca Profissional was a successor to the Simca Alvorada, which was itself a stripped version of the entry level Simca Chambord. Simca do Brasil had responded reluctantly to the demand by the Brazilian government of president Juscelino Kubitscheck that every car manufacturer must offer an affordable basic version within their range. The idea was to give as many Brazilians as possible the opportunity to own a car.

New incentive, new version
In 1965, the Brazilian government created a new public financing tool through its publicly owned bank Caixa Econômica Federal that would allow Brazilians to finance their vehicle over four years with a monthly interest rate of 1%. This obviously was to attract a new range of clients and Simca do Brasil looked into how to make the Alvorada even cheaper in order to make it attractive for, for example for taxicab drivers.

Plastic replaces leather
The Simca Profissional appeared in 1965 with three colour options (yellow, green and cream white), no chrome (even the bumpers were painted in dark gray, no trimmings), the already very simple interior of the Alvorada was downscaled further with plastic seat covers and the door covers were dark and naked cardboard screwed onto the metal. But the Profissional was 30% cheaper than its far posher brother, the all chrome and leather Simca Chambord. The production numbers of this version apparently were never documented and, unlike the Simca Alvorada, the Simca Profissional had no distinct range of chassis numbers so that this version is mixed in with  the production figures cited for the Simca Chambord.

Production figures
 1965 - 1966 = number of units produced not documented by Simca do Brasil

References 

"Automóveis Brasileiros" by author Enio Brandenburg, FBVA, Rio de Janeiro – Brasil
"The Automobile in South America - The Origins (Argentina, Brazil, Paraguay, Uruguay)" by author Álvaro Casal Tatlock, FBVA, Rio de Janeiro – Brasil
"Automóveis de São Paulo" by author Malcom Forest, FBVA, Rio de Janeiro – Brasil

External links
/  Simca Club Brazil

Profissional
Cars introduced in 1965